Plum Creek is a stream in Sauk and Vernon counties, in the U.S. state of Wisconsin.

Plum Creek was named for the wild plum trees in the area.

See also
List of rivers of Wisconsin

References

Rivers of Sauk County, Wisconsin
Rivers of Vernon County, Wisconsin
Rivers of Wisconsin